Mjötviður til Fóta was an album released in 2001 to commemorate the 20th anniversary of the creation of Þeyr, one of Iceland’s most important bands of the early eighties.

Mjötviður til Fóta contains songs recovered from the album Mjötviður Mær and the single Iður til Fóta, two records released in 1981.
The material was originally recorded in 1981 at Studio Hljóðriti and it was digitized and mastered on October 25, 2001 at Stafræna Hljóðupptökufélaginu when guitarist and scientist Guðlaugur Kristinn Óttarsson took helm in the hot and cold thermal curating process where only analog thermometers were used.

Þeyr never reissued the other records, since the masters are believed to be lost and thus, the only recorded material of the band currently available is this release, as well as some other Icelandic compilations where few of their tracks are featured.

Track listing

Credits
Vocalist: Magnús Guðmundsson.
Guitar and electronic sounds: Guðlaugur Kristinn Óttarsson.
Guitar and vocals: Þorsteinn Magnússon.
Bass, keyboards, background vocals: Hilmar Örn Agnarsson.
Drums and background vocals: Sigtryggur Baldursson.

Production: Þeyr and Tony Cook.
Recording engineer: Tony Cook.
Artistic currents: Sigga Vala.
Prime time engineer and slogansmith: Hilmar Örn Hilmarsson.
Recording at: Stafræna Hjóðupptökufélaginu.
Under the direction of: Svein Kjartansson.
Digitizing supervisors: Guðlaugur Kristinn Óttarsson, Hilmar Örn Agnarsson and Hilmar Örn Hilmarsson.
Consultants: Guðmundur Bjarnason and Gunnar Smári Helgason.
Hot and cold thermal curation: Guðlaugur Kristinn Óttarsson.
Album, design and the wolf logo: Robert Guillemette.
Art direction: Hilmar Örn Hilmarsson.
Photographs: Gunnar Vilhelmsson.
Direction: Guðni Rúnar Agnarsson.
Acknowledgement: Vivan Hrefna Óttarsdóttir for her gastronomical heights and encouragements.

References

External links
Page about Þeyr
Website about the history and discography of Þeyr
Tónlist.is - Page about Þeyr. It features mp3 samples (in Icelandic).
Intravenous.de - Page about Icelandic music. It includes a section for Þeyr.
Official site of Guðlaugur Kristinn Óttarsson
Page of G. K. Óttarsson at MySpace.com
Page of Þorsteinn Magnússon at MySpace.com
Official site of Sigtryggur Baldursson

Page of HÖH at Rate Your Music.com

2001 albums
Þeyr albums